This is a list of all personnel changes for the 2021 EuroLeague off-season and 2021–22 EuroLeague season.

Retirements
The following players retired during the 2020–21 EuroLeague, having played in more than three EuroLeague seasons.

Managerial changes

Managerial changes

Player movements

Between two EuroLeague teams

To a EuroLeague team

Leaving a EuroLeague team

References

Transactions
EuroLeague transactions